John Goetz is a baseball player.

John or Jack Goetz may also refer to:

John Goetz (filmmaker), director of Uncle Vanya (1957 film)
John Goetz (Jericho)
Jack Goetz, pseudonym of Ronnie Barker